Bastilla flavipurpurea is a moth of the family Noctuidae first described by Jeremy Daniel Holloway in 1976. It is found endemic to Borneo.

References

External links

Bastilla (moth)
Moths described in 1976